The Boston Glory is a professional ultimate team that plays in the East Division of the American Ultimate Disc League (AUDL). The team was announced on December 4, 2019, and played its first season in 2021 owing to the Covid-related cancellation of the AUDL 2020 season.

History
On September 27, 2019, the AUDL announced that franchise rights had been sold for the Boston area, and that the ownership group was looking for operating personnel with the goal of beginning play in the 2020 season. On December 4, the team was announced as an expansion franchise for the 2020 season. Former ultimate players Peter Collery and Robert Ruocco were announced as co-owners, and Mat Little and Jay Talerman were announced as general manager and director of operations, respectively. The team was also confirmed to compete in the league's newly-realigned East division. On December 19, the team announced its name as "Glory," citing the movie Glory, the nickname of the American flag, Old Glory, and a Boston-area club ultimate team named "Death or Glory."

References

External links

2020 establishments in Massachusetts
Medford, Massachusetts
Sports in Middlesex County, Massachusetts
Sports teams in Massachusetts
Ultimate (sport) teams
Ultimate teams established in 2020